Club Deportivo Zamarat, (known as Quesos El Pastor La Polvorosa for sponsorship reasons) is a Spanish women's basketball club from Zamora founded in 1994. Attaining promotion to the LFB in 2011, it ranked 10th with a 9–17 balance in its debut season.

Notable players

Season by season

References

Liga Femenina de Baloncesto teams
Women's basketball teams in Spain
Basketball teams established in 1994
Sport in Zamora, Spain
Basketball teams in Castile and León